Shek Tong Tsui Terminus is a tram stop and one of the seven termini of Hong Kong Tramways, a double-decker tram system. Located in Shek Tong Tsui, it is one of the system's three termini in the Central and Western District on Hong Kong Island.

Routes
Shek Tong Tsui ↔ Causeway Bay
Shek Tong Tsui ↔ North Point

Whitty Street Depot
A tramcar depot is located nearby on Fung Mat Road at Water Street. The depot contains workshop facilities and a storage yard capable of holding 109 tramcars. It replaced the Sharp Street East Depot.

References

Hong Kong Tramways stops